Zhi Dun (314-366 CE) was a Chinese Buddhist monk and philosopher. A Chinese author, scholar, and confidant of Chinese government officials in 350 CE, he claimed that all who followed Buddhism would, at the end of their life, enter Nirvana.

In his book, A Short History of Chinese Philosophy, Feng Youlan recounts a story from the Shishuo Xinyu regarding Zhi Dun's fondness for cranes:"Once a friend gave him two young [cranes]. When they grew up, Chih-tun was forced to clip their wings so that they would not fly away. When this was done, the cranes looked despondent, and Chih-tun too was depressed, and said: "Since they have wings that can reach the sky, how can they be content to be a pet of man?" Hence when their feathers had grown again, he let the cranes fly away."

References

314 births
366 deaths
4th-century Chinese philosophers
Chinese scholars of Buddhism
Jin dynasty (266–420) philosophers
Jin dynasty (266–420) essayists
Jin dynasty (266–420) Buddhist monks
Philosophers from Henan
Writers from Kaifeng